Rosa Laricchiuta (born February 26, 1974) is a Canadian singer-songwriter born in Montreal, Quebec. She started singing in a karaoke bar in Montreal in the 2000s. A music agent noticed Rosa's talent and hired her to sing in 5 Stars Hotels and Casinos in Asia.

After 10 years of touring, she came back to Montreal and eventually moved to New Brunswick where she entered the third season of the TVA reality show La Voix (2015), the French Canadian version of the popular American show The Voice. Her blind audition song was "Perfect" by Pink. All four coaches turned around for her. She eventually picked Quebec rocker Éric Lapointe as her coach. Singing "The Show Must Go On" from legendary rock band Queen in the semi finals, Rosa displayed her strong stage presence, intensity and powerful voice to obtain her ticket to the big finale. In the finale Rosa also had the opportunity to share the stage with Def Leppard, Kelly Clarkson, Jean Leloup and her idol Melissa Etheridge. Even if Rosa didn’t win the big prize, she left a strong impression as a new female rocker on the Quebec music scene.

After the show ended, her coach Eric Lapointe offered Rosa to be his backing vocalist for his tour.

She was also invited by Melissa Etheridge to perform "Bring me some water" in Moncton and Montreal in her Canadian tour.

Shortly after, she signed with S7 Productions for a French Album directed by famous Quebec singer-songwriter Sylvain Cossette who won several awards and is well respected in the Quebec music industry. Her first album in French, Rosa, was launched in October 2015. Three of its songs got airplay in French Canadian radios in Quebec and New Brunswick. Her song "Manquer de toi" was a charted hit.

In 2016, Rosa is touring with her show Bête de Scène all over Quebec and New Brunswick. She is also part of «5X5» and «Glam rock» and working with Éric Lapointe. Rosa is currently working on her first English album.

From 2016 to 2019, Rosa was hired to tour with multi-platinum selling Rock Progressive band Trans-Siberian Orchestra for the USA West Coast tour.

In 2017, Laricchiuta released her first English EP entitled FREE.

In June 2018, Laricchiuta played the role SADIA for the Rock Opera Musical Quebec Issime chante STARMANIA made popular by producer Luc Plamondon for a total of three tours in Quebec.

In August 2018, Laricchiuta signed a four year contract with the record label Frontiers and just finished recording her full English rock album to be released in the Spring of 2020.

Discography 
 Rosa (2015)

Black Rose Maze  
 Black Rose Maze (2020)

References 

1974 births
Canadian women singer-songwriters
Canadian singer-songwriters
Living people
Singers from Montreal
Songwriters from Quebec
Writers from Montreal
Canadian women rock singers
21st-century Canadian women singers